Román Ongpin y Tanbensiang was a Chinese Filipino businessman and philanthropist who aided Filipino revolutionaries against the Spanish and American colonial administration in the Philippine islands.

Early life
Ongpin was born in Binondo, Manila on February 28, 1847 to Simon Ongpin and Sinfrosa Tanbensiang. His father Simón Ongpin (hispanized as "Ongpinco" (later shortened to become "Ongpin") was among those who migrated from mainland China to do business in the Philippines. Ongpin learned about doing business at a young age.

Career
Ongpin established his own business in 1883 he dubbed "El 82" after the cholera outbreak in the Philippines a year before. The name was chosen as a symbol of rebirth of the archipelago from the health disaster. Ongpin's business was a success, and his wealth and social standing improved. He pioneered the use of fixed pricing and double-entry accounting system. One of the exclusive products that El 82 sold was art supplies. Ongpin's wife Pascuala Domingo was a descendant of Filipino artist Damián Domingo. Through this, Ongpin got involved with the illustrados.

Ongpin was a financier of the Katipunan, letting the revolutionaries use his store as a secret hideout. Ongpin also provided financial aid and food to the revolutionary movement until the end of the Spanish colonization of the Philippines. Ongpin once again aided the Filipinos following the Philippine–American War and was imprisoned by the Americans from December 1900 until March 1901.

Despite attaining freedom from imprisonment, Ongpin remained opposed to the United States' occupation of the Philippines. He expressed this sentiment by refusing to sell to Americans and teaching his children to be self-sufficient without help from foreigners.

Ongpin also had civic involvements and held posts in organizations. He was the Teniente Primo de Mestizos, president of Casa Asilo de Invalidos Filipinos de Guerra an institution for veterans of Pascual Poblete, and treasurer of Union Obrera de Filipinas of Isabelo de los Reyes. He also had membership at the Philippine Chamber of Commerce.

Death and legacy
Ongpin died on December 10, 1912, due to heart ailment. Before his death, he requested his family to dress his remains in a barong tagalog. He was interred at the North Cemetery of Manila.

The street Calle Sacristia in Manila was renamed as Ongpin Street on September 17, 1915 and a monument of Ongpin was built near the Binondo Church and the Plaza de Binondo (now Plaza San Lorenzo Ruiz).

References

1847 births
1912 deaths
Filipino people of Chinese descent
19th-century Filipino businesspeople
Filipino philanthropists
People from Binondo
People of the Philippine Revolution
People of the Philippine–American War
Burials at the Manila North Cemetery
19th-century philanthropists